Jairo Geovanny Sanchez-Scott (born 10 December 1987) is a Caymanian footballer who plays as a midfielder. He has represented the Cayman Islands during World Cup qualifying matches in 2011

References

Living people
1987 births
Caymanian footballers
Cayman Islands international footballers
Cayman Islands under-20 international footballers
Association football midfielders
Elite SC players